The Creston Cyclones were a minor league baseball team based in Creston, Iowa. In 1903, the Cyclones played as members of the short–lived Class D level Southwest Iowa League, joining the league in mid–season as an expansion team. The "Cyclones" moniker corresponds to a tornado that struck Creston, Iowa in May, 1903.

History
The 1903 Creston Cyclones were the only minor league baseball team based in Creston, Iowa. The Cyclones played as members of the six–team Class D level Southwest Iowa League, along with Atlantic, Clarinda, Osceola, Iowa the Red Oak Blue Indians and Shenandoah, with the league beginning play on May 29, 1903 without Creston. On June 29, 1903, Creston and the Osceola team joined the Southwest Iowa League, which had begun play as a four–team league.

The team's "Cyclones" moniker corresponds to a tornado that hit Creston, Iowa on May 26, 1903. One person was killed and many injured in the tornado, that also badly damaged several homes, businesses and a church.

On March 25, 1903, the Southwest Iowa League was formed at a meeting and E.H. Whiteside, of Atlantic, Iowa elected league president. Creston, Iowa representatives were concerned about the league's $400 monthly salary limit and declined to field a team for the upcoming season. The league began play with four Iowa teams in Atlantic, Clarinda, Shenandoah and Red Oak as the charter member franchises. The league disallowed playing games on Sundays.

After the Southwest Iowa League opened league play, a Creston independent team had formed and played numerous exhibition games against league member teams. Because of their positive play, Creston had renewed interest in joining the Southwest Iowa League. At a June 25, 1903 Southwest Iowa League meeting, Creston was awarded an immediate membership in the league. Osceola also was awarded a team, with the two new franchises expanding the league to six teams. After beginning league play, Atlantic protested an August 15, 1903 game against Creston due to umpiring.

Beginning play in the Southwest Iowa League on June 29, 1903, Creston was competitive, but the league was unable to complete the season. The Creston Cyclones had a 24–19 record when the league folded on August 29, 1903. The Creston manager was Jack Corbett, as the Cyclones ended the season in 3rd place overall, finishing 2.0 games behind 1st place Shenandoah.
 
Creston has not hosted another minor league team.

The ballpark
The name of the Creston home minor league ballpark is not directly referenced. It is known that Creston played games against Osceola in the neutral town of Afton, Iowa.

Year–by–year record

Notable alumni
The player roster for the Creston Cyclones is unknown.

References

External links
Creston - Baseball Reference

Defunct minor league baseball teams
Professional baseball teams in Iowa
Defunct baseball teams in Iowa
Baseball teams established in 1903
Baseball teams disestablished in 1903
1903 establishments in Iowa
Creston, Iowa
Union County, Iowa
Southwest Iowa League teams